The 1977 King's Cup finals were held from October 28 to November 12, 1977, once again in Bangkok. This was the 10th edition of the international football competition.

The tournaments schedule was changed from previous edition and back to a one group round robin phase previously seen in 1972 and 1975. The winners and runners up entered a final.

Fixtures and results

Group stage

Indonesia were represented by Persipura.

Final

''Title shared

Winner

External links
 RSSSF

King's Cup
Kings Cup, 1977
Kings Cup, 1977
International association football competitions hosted by Thailand